United Kingdom commercial law is the law which regulates the sale and purchase of goods and services, when doing business in the United Kingdom.

History

Lex Mercatoria
Hanseatic league
Guild
Mercantilism
Freedom of contract
Laissez faire

Foundations

Personal property

Real property and personal property
Ownership
Equitable ownership
Possession
Attornment
Bailment

Contracts

Commercial contracts

Agency

In the case of Watteau v Fenwick, Lord Coleridge CJ on the Queen's Bench concurred with an opinion by Wills J that a third party could hold personally liable a principal who he did know about when he sold cigars to an agent that was acting outside of its authority. Wills J held that "the principal is liable for all the acts of the agent which are within the authority usually confided to an agent of that character, notwithstanding limitations, as between the principal and the agent, put upon that authority." This decision is heavily criticised and doubted, though not entirely overruled in the UK. It is sometimes referred to as "usual authority" (though not in the sense used by Lord Denning MR in Hely-Hutchinson, where it is synonymous with "implied actual authority"). It has been explained as a form of apparent authority, or "inherent agency power".

Hely-Hutchinson v Brayhead Ltd [1968] 1 QB 549
Creation and authority of agents
Disclosed and undisclosed agency
Agent duties and rights
Termination of agency

Sale of goods

Sale of Goods Act 1979

Sale of Goods Act 1979, the primary statute applicable to the sale of goods.

Property passing and delivery
Title retention clause

Terms, acceptance and rejection
Unfair Contract Terms Act 1977
Consumer Protection (Distance Selling) Regulations 2000

Remedies and duties

United Nations Convention on Contracts for the International Sale of Goods
UNCITRAL Model Law on International Commercial Arbitration

Bills of exchange and banking

Negotiable instrument
Bill of exchange
Bank regulation
Payment systems
Cheques

Assignment and receivables

International sales

United Nations Convention on Contracts for the International Sale of Goods
Free alongside ship contract
Free on board contract
Cost, insurance, freight contract

Commercial credit and security

Possessory security

Pledges
Liens

Non-possessory security

Mortgage
Equitable charge
Equitable lien

Guarantees

Insurance law

Life Assurance Act 1774
uberrimae fidei
Subrogation
Marine insurance and Marine Insurance Act 1906

Insolvency law

See also
International commercial law
Islamic Commercial Law
UK competition law
UK labour law
UK company law
European Union Value Added Tax
Bill of lading
Principal (commercial law)
Centre for Commercial Law Studies

Notes

References
L Sealy and RJA Hooley, Commercial Law: Texts, Cases and Materials (4th edn OUP, Oxford 2008)
Roy Goode, Commercial law (3rd edn Penguin, London 2004)

United Kingdom business law